The Slovak men's national under 20 ice hockey team is the national under-20 ice hockey team in Slovakia. The team represents Slovakia at the International Ice Hockey Federation's IIHF World U20 Championship.

Current roster
Roster for the 2023 World Junior Ice Hockey Championships.

Head coach: Ivan Feneš

World Junior Championship record

† Includes one win in extra time (in the preliminary round)
^ Includes one loss in extra time (in the preliminary round)
* Includes one win in extra time (in the playoff round)
+ Includes one loss in extra time (in the playoff round)

Head coaches (WJC)

1994 Július Šupler
1995 Dušan Žiška
1996–97 František Hossa
1998 Dušan Žiška
1999 Ján Filc
2000 Dušan Žiška
2001 Ján Selvek
2002 Július Šupler
2003 Róbert Spišák
2004 Jozef Frühauf
2005 Dušan Gregor
2006 Branislav Šajban
2007 Ján Jaško
2008–11 Štefan Mikeš
2012–18 Ernest Bokroš
2019–2021 Róbert Petrovický
2022 Ivan Feneš

References

External links
Official website
IIHF profile

Junior
Junior national ice hockey teams